Ziaida is a town and rural commune in Ben Slimane Province, Casablanca-Settat, Morocco. According to the 2014 census it had a population of 12,389.

It is also a tribe arab yéménite .

References

Populated places in Benslimane Province
Rural communes of Casablanca-Settat